Shafilea Iftikhar Ahmed (Punjabi and ; 14 July 1986 – 11 September 2003) was a British-Pakistani girl who was murdered by her parents in a suspected honour killing at the age of 17, due to their belief that she had become too Westernised.

Ahmed's parents were each subsequently imprisoned for a minimum of 25 years for her murder in August 2012. The possibility of other individuals having helped her parents to dispose of their daughter's body has been raised; after the parents' trial, the chief executive of the Bradford Council for Mosques encouraged anybody with information about the case to come forward with information to assist police.

Background
Shafilea Ahmed was born on 14 July 1986 in Bradford, West Yorkshire, the daughter of Pakistani immigrant parents. She had the nickname "Shaf". Her parents, who are of the Sunni branch of Islam and native Punjabi speakers, originated from the village of Uttam in the Gujrat District. The family lived in the Great Sankey area of Warrington, Cheshire. Ahmed attended Great Sankey High School, its sixth form centre Barrowhall College, and Priestley College from September 2003. She was an A-Level student and hoped to become a solicitor.

During a trip to Pakistan earlier in 2003, Ahmed had swallowed bleach in what was reported to be a suicide attempt. Her parents claimed this had been a simple mistake and that she had drunk the bleach during a power cut because she thought it was mouth wash, a claim prosecutors called "a stupid and obvious lie". Ahmed suffered extensive damage to her throat for which she was having regular ongoing care at the time of her disappearance. According to media reports, she had turned down a suitor in a forced marriage during this trip, although her parents denied there being any attempts made to pressure her into agreeing to the prospective marriage.

Murder
Ahmed disappeared  11 September 2003, and had been missing for a week before her teachers informed the police. Subsequently, a major campaign urged anyone with information to come forward. Actress Shobna Gulati fronted the media campaign and read some of her poems on television. A nationwide hunt was launched, but when Ahmed failed to seek treatment for her damaged throat, detectives became convinced she had been murdered in a possible "honour killing" connected to her rejection of her Pakistani suitor. Superintendent Geraint Jones told the Daily Mirror that "her family say a suitor had been found for her in Pakistan but she was free to make her own decisions".

Police said the corpse was deliberately hidden, and a gold "zigzag" bracelet and blue topaz ring found with the body were identified by her parents. Due to the advanced decomposition of her remains, the cause of death could not be determined by coroner Alison Armer. Detective Sergeant Mike Foster stated at a hearing, "The pathologist could not determine the cause of death, but did say the body was that of a young female. Obviously, because of the condition of the body, she was unable to give any further findings." Police believe the body had probably been there since the day she disappeared or not long after. A second post mortem ordered by South Lakeland coroner Cyril Prickett failed to add anything further.

Inspector Mike Forrester of Cumbria Constabulary stated at an inquest hearing that "it was unclear whether all of Ahmed's body parts had been found" and that DNA tests "made it a one in a billion chance that the remains were those of anyone other than Shafilea". Ahmed's dentist said he was 90% sure that the lower jaw found was hers after examining the dental work carried out on it.

Ahmed's parents, 51-year-old taxi driver Iftikhar Ahmed and 48-year-old housewife Farzana Ahmed, were released without charge after briefly having been arrested along with five other members of her extended family. Several of Ahmed's poems interested the police, notably "I Feel Trapped", which is said to reflect Ahmed's despairing emotional state and describe a hopeless life with a family that ignored her, and that she had run away from home several times. Ahmed's friend Sarah Bennett recalled an occasion when Ahmed had been branded a "slut" by her mother for dying her hair and wearing false nails. Neighbour Sheila Costello said, "She has been reported missing twice before and been found staying with friends. We heard they had an argument over an arranged/forced marriage and that Shafi had run away. I hope nothing terrible has happened to her."

After three years, Cheshire Constabulary had not established a suspect, although eight members of Ahmed's extended family were arrested on suspicion of conspiracy to pervert the course of justice. Proceedings against them were dropped. An unidentified human hair not from members of her immediate family was reportedly found on Ahmed's foot.

Inquest into death
In January 2008, the coroner's inquest held that Ahmed was the victim of a "very vile murder", having been taken from her home on Liverpool Road in Warrington; the verdict was unlawful killing. Her family left the inquest without making any comment. After the inquest, her parents attempted unsuccessfully to have the verdict of unlawful killing overturned and replaced by an open verdict; her father argued that the coroner's view was "biased".

Trial and imprisonment of parents
Ahmed's younger sister Alesha arranged a robbery that took place at her parents' house on 25 August 2010, during which she, her brother, sisters, and parents were in the house. She was arrested and told police that her parents had killed Ahmed. She told police that after trying to force Ahmed to accept the arranged marriage, her parents were afraid her refusal would bring shame on the family, so her father put a plastic bag in Ahmed's mouth and suffocated her to death.

On 7 September 2011, Cheshire Police announced that Ahmed's parents had been charged with her murder. Their trial began in May 2012, and they were both found guilty of murder and sentenced to life imprisonment with a minimum term of 25 years on 3 August 2012. Mr Justice Roderick Evans said, "An expectation that she live in a sealed cultural environment separate from the culture of the country in which she lived was unrealistic, destructive and cruel." Cheshire Police purposefully did not refer to events as an "honour killing", clarifying they do not legally recognise the term and that what had happened was simply murder.

After the trial, police were said to be looking into the possibility that Ahmed's parents had help when they dumped her body in 2003, and that they were looking into new information revealed during the trial. In August 2012, the chief executive of Bradford Council for Mosques encouraged anybody knowing about the case to come forward and said his group would help police.

Aftermath
Following the conviction of Ahmed's parents for her murder, Ahmed's close friend Melissa Powner read a statement outside the court:

 
On 14 July 2015, the first National Day of Memory for Victims of Honour Killings was held. Organised by the Leeds-based charity Karma Nirvana, it is held annually on Ahmed's birthday.

In August 2022, the podcast Method & Madness released an episode featuring Shafilea's case.

See also

Honour killings in the United Kingdom:
 Murder of Rania Alayed
 Murder of Banaz Mahmod
 Murder of Samaira Nazir
 The killing of Surjit Athwal was planned in the UK and carried out in India
 Murder of Tulay Goren
 Murder of Heshu Yones
 Murder of Rukhsana Naz
Honour killings of those of Pakistani heritage:
 Sandeela Kanwal (United States)
 Gazala Khan (Denmark)
 Aqsa Parvez (Canada)
 Hina Saleem (Italy)
 Sadia Sheikh (Belgium)

Cited works and further reading
 
 
  -  Print   - PDF preview of chapter

References

External links

 When Missing Turns to Murder: Shafilea Ahmed - A Victim Of Honour Abuse. Crime and Investigation Documentary 2019

2003 in England
2003 murders in the United Kingdom
2000s in Cheshire
2000s missing person cases
2010s trials
Female murder victims
Filicides in England
Formerly missing people
History of Warrington
Honour killing in the United Kingdom
Incidents of violence against girls
Missing person cases in England
Murder in Cheshire
Murder trials
September 2003 crimes
September 2003 events in the United Kingdom
Trials in England
Violence against women in England